SS Armenian was an 1895-built British cargo liner built for the Leyland Line, but managed by the White Star Line from 20 March 1903. She was employed on the cargo service between Liverpool and New York City, with the passenger service between the two ports having been previously withdrawn. In 1910 she was repainted in the Leyland livery (a pink funnel with black top).

War service
Second Boer War

The Armenian was fitted out to transport horses and used as a transport in the South African War. In 1901, the ship was briefly used as a prison ship for Boer prisoners of war in Simon's Town in the Cape Colony. In the same year was she used to transport 963 Boer prisoners of war to Darrell's and Burt's Islands in Bermuda, and 1017 Boer prisoners of war to India. In 1902, the Armenian transported a further 150 prisoners of war to India.

First World War
The Armenian made a last sailing on 3 March 1914 before being briefly laid up prior to deployment as a horse and mule transport to France.

Sinking

On 28 June 1915 she was engaged by the German submarine  captained by Rudolf Schneider off Trevose Head, Cornwall. After a failed attempt at escape the crew were allowed to abandon ship and the vessel was sunk by two torpedoes fired into her stern. Twenty-nine members of the mostly American crew were lost in the sinking, along with the vessel's cargo of over 1,400 mules.

Following on from the sinking of the  52 days earlier, the sinking caused a second crisis to develop between Germany and the United States as the majority of the men who died were Americans. The survivors were picked up the following day by the Belgian steam trawler President Stevens, although four of the survivors later died.

Wreck
The 2002 discovery of the wreck turned out to be incorrect, with the wreck of the auxiliary cruiser HMS Patia being misidentified by amateur divers. SS Armenian was featured on the History Channel in an episode of Deep Wreck Mysteries entitled Search for the Bone Wreck where it was successfully located and identified by the wreck hunter and archaeologist Innes McCartney. The wreck of the "mule ship" sits upright in 95 metres of water, forty five miles from the reported sinking location given by the British. McCartney used German archival documents located in Freiburg-im-Breisgau to pinpoint the location of the site.

References

Ships built in Belfast
Passenger ships of the United Kingdom
Steamships
Ships of the White Star Line
1895 ships
Ships built by Harland and Wolff
Maritime incidents in 1915
Ships sunk by German submarines in World War I
World War I shipwrecks in the Atlantic Ocean
Protected Wrecks of the United Kingdom